Henry Milton Hall (17 December 1882 – 27 July 1967) was an Australian rules football player who played with St Kilda in the Victorian Football League (VFL).

Notes

External links 

1882 births
1967 deaths
Australian rules footballers from Victoria (Australia)
St Kilda Football Club players
Eaglehawk Football Club players